The I.O.O.F. Building, Mason Valley, located at 1 S. Main St. in Yerington, Nevada, is a building designed by prominent Nevada architect Frederick J. DeLongchamps that was built in 1913–14.  It was listed on the National Register of Historic Places in 1983.

It was deemed significant for its association with the community development of Yerington, in which the International Order of Odd Fellows group played a role, and for being designed by DeLongchamps.

References 

Buildings and structures completed in 1913
Buildings and structures in Lyon County, Nevada
Odd Fellows buildings in Nevada
Clubhouses on the National Register of Historic Places in Nevada
Frederic Joseph DeLongchamps buildings
1913 establishments in Nevada
National Register of Historic Places in Lyon County, Nevada